Mërgim Neziri (born 30 April 1993) is a German–Albanian footballer who plays for 1. Göppinger SV.

Career

Club career
On 21 June 2019 Neziri returned to his former club, VfR Aalen, on a 1-year contract. On 15 January 2020 both parties accepted to terminate the contract. He then returned to his hometown Göppingen and signed with SV Göppingen on 2 February 2020.

References

External links

1993 births
Living people
People from Göppingen
Sportspeople from Stuttgart (region)
Footballers from Baden-Württemberg
German footballers
Kosovan footballers
Albanian footballers
Association football defenders
Association football midfielders
German people of Albanian descent
German people of Kosovan descent
3. Liga players
VfR Aalen players
Regionalliga players
1. FC Nürnberg II players
SV Seligenporten players
SSV Ulm 1846 players
Liga I players
FC Botoșani players
Football Superleague of Kosovo players
FC Prishtina players
Kategoria Superiore players
FC Kamza players
Liga II players
Oberliga (football) players
FC Petrolul Ploiești players
Luftëtari Gjirokastër players
Kosovan expatriate footballers
Albanian expatriate footballers
Kosovan expatriate sportspeople in Romania
Albanian expatriate sportspeople in Romania
Expatriate footballers in Romania